Kasama District is a central district of Northern Province, Zambia. It surrounds the provincial capital of Kasama town. As of the 2000 Zambian Census, the district had a population of 170,929 people. It consists of two constituencies, namely Kasama Central and Lukashya.

Towns and villages
Achitende

References

Districts of Northern Province, Zambia
Kasama, Zambia